Lady Lovely Locks and the Pixietails is a character property created by American Greetings Corporation (creators of Strawberry Shortcake, Care Bears and Popples among others) in the mid-1980s. The characters were licensed for a toyline by Mattel, and for a syndicated animated television series by DiC Animation City in 1987. Only 20 episodes were produced in all.

Toy line
The Lady Lovely Locks toyline was created by Mattel and produced from 1987 to 1989. The toyline consists of character dolls that are approximately 8.5 inches tall, with certain dolls having long, colorful locks. Most dolls came with three to four Pixietails (small plastic squirrel-like animals with long silky tails). The Pixietails could be worn in the hair of either the doll or the child. Additional items in the toyline were other pets and setting playsets.

Animated series
Lady Lovely Locks is the princess of the Kingdom of Lovely Locks. She and her friends are aided by the Pixietails in keeping the kingdom safe from its enemies. Among the hero characters of the show are Lady Lovely Locks, Maiden Fair Hair, Maiden Curly Crown, the Pixietails, Prince Strong Heart, Shining Glory, Silky Pup (a puppy), and Silky Mane (a pony). The main villains are Duchess Ravenwaves, Hairball and Comb Gnomes, the latter of whom tend to speak in rhyme. The show was cancelled after one season.

The series was produced by the French and Japanese animators of Rainbow Brite and Jem, among other cartoons of the '80s. The music of the series was composed by Shuki Levy and Haim Saban and supervised by Marty Wereski. The original "Lady Lovely Locks" theme song was composed by Shuki Levy and produced by the music department of Saban Productions and performed by Donna De Lory. The original full theme song can be heard on Shuki Levy's official website.

Hi-Tops released five Lady Lovely Locks videos in the '80s. More recently, the videos re-appeared on the market. They resurfaced as part of the DVD set "Girls Rule Vol. 1" which included the following cartoon series: Jem, Rainbow Brite, and Lady Lovely Locks. Several of the episodes are also available on a DVD in the "Biggest DVD Ever" series for Lady Lovely Locks. Two episodes have never been collected except on the Australian VHS edition.

The series episodes are as follows:
 "To Save My Kingdom": written by Jack Olesker
 "Cruel Pretender": written by Jack Olesker
 "Vanished": written by Jack Olesker
 "The Wishing Bone": written by Jack Olesker
 "The Discovery": written by Jack Olesker 
 "The Lake of Reflections": written by Jody Miles Conner
 "The Menace of Mirror Lake": written by Phil Harnage
 "Blue Moon": written by Phil Harnage
 "The Bundle": written by Howard R. Cohen
 "In the Kingdom of Ice": written by Phil Harnage
 "The Power and the Glory": written by Jeff Rose
 "Prince's Broken Heart": written by Howard R. Cohen
 "The Noble Deed": written by Jack Olesker
 "The Doubt": written by Susan J. Leslie
 "The Dragon Tree": written by Jack Olesker
 "The Capture": written by Jack Olesker
 "The Keeper": written by Jack Olesker
 "The Rally": written by Jack Olesker
 "Fire in the Sky": written by Jack Olesker
 "To Take a Castle": written by Jack Olesker

Characters

Protagonists
Lady Lovely Locks - the main protagonist. She wears a pink dress and has blonde hair with streaks symbolizing her royalty in three colors: soft pink (dawn), gold (sun) and lavender (twilight). She is the princess of Kingdom Lovely Locks, as well as its main source of power and life. She is a very loyal, brave, kind, selfless, polite, resourceful, optimistic, dependable and friendly individual who always treasures her home. 
Maiden Fair Hair - a maiden and best friend of Lady Lovely Locks who wears a blue dress and has her brunette hair done in waves. A natural beauty, party-planner, daydreamer and painter, she is very serene, cool-headed, and intelligent, but would sometimes lose track of something important and/or, to the extent, her sense of direction.
Maiden Curly Crown - another maiden and friend of Lady Lovely Locks who wears a yellow dress and has her orange hair done in curls. A funny and imaginative girl with a big heart, she loves making up stories, styling her hair, and collecting bugs, but is somewhat impulsive and, despite being quite smart, would sometimes get herself into trouble.
Silky Mane - Lady's kind-hearted, trusty royal horse who always understands her thoughts and feelings.
Silky Pup - Lady's happy-go-lucky, yet trouble-prone pet puppy who has a secret crush on the Prince.
Shining Glory - a blind, yet very wise and powerful sorcerer and wizard, and the beloved mentor to Lady and her friends. He often aids Lady with his magic. It is also said that he has adopted the Prince after he was cursed.
Prince Strong Heart - originally a human, but was turned into a dog as a result of a dreadful curse. He often visits the castle gardens after since he was adopted by Shining Glory. In times, the opportunity for him to turn into human again comes; however, he rather puts this aside into helping his companions, such as coming to Lady's rescue when she is in danger. He was not much likely seen in his previous appearance.

Antagonists
Duchess Raven Waves - the main antagonist. She wears a purple dress and, like Maiden FairHair, her black hair done in waves. She is the mean, jealous, cruel, stubborn, selfish, domineering, cold, careless and conniving ruler of Tangleland, as well as the main archenemy of Lady Lovely Locks. Duchess always plots evil schemes to take over the kingdom of Lovely Locks for herself, and believes that cutting off a piece of her rival's hair would do it.
Hair Ball - a former apprentice of Shining Glory who is now in employ of RavenWaves. Deemed untrustworthy by good people, he specializes in magic and is very practical when it comes to making and causing trouble. He also acts miserable when he feels defeated; however, this makes him quite sympathetic to his peers.
Comb Gnomes - creatures with big ears and wild-looking hair and fur and henchmen of Duchess RavenWaves and accomplices to HairBall. They are very mischievous and mean-spirited, yet lazy and irresponsible during a plan and become upset when their part of a planned scheme fails. They are also archenemies to the Pixietails, as they all have magical powers, of which theirs is a lightning attack. Their names were Snags, Dulla and Tanglet. Unlike the Pixietails, these were the only three Comb Gnomes ever to be seen in the entire series.

The Pixietails
The Pixietails are fairy-like animals, who help Lady Lovely Locks when she is in need for a problem or someone's in trouble. Lady's Pixietails are rabbit-like creatures, FairHair's Pixietails are chipmunk/squirrel-like creatures and CurlyCrown's Pixietails are bird-like creatures.

Pixieshine - A blue rabbit-like Pixietail under the ownership of Lady Lovely Locks.
Pixiebeauty - A purple rabbit-like Pixietail under the ownership of Lady Lovely Locks.
Pixiesparkle - A pink rabbit-like Pixietail under the ownership of Lady Lovely Locks.

Dragons
Dragons exist in the kingdom. They can breathe fire and have wings to fly with. Instead of eggs, newborn dragons are born from the Dragon Tree. A plant called Dragon’s Hair has some connection.

Longcurl - The mother of the dragon triplets.
Sweetcurl
Merrycurl
Bouncycurl

Books
A number of tie-in books were released alongside the toyline and animated series. Among these books are "An Enchanting Fairy-Tale Adventure", "For the Love of Lovely Locks", "Lady Lovely Locks Original Story" (1987), "Silkypup Saves the Day", "Silkypup's Butterfly Adventure" (1987) and "The Golden Ball".

Pop culture 
In the eighth season episode of the series That '70s Show, "Killer Queen", the character Randy says: "Donna, Hyde's already given me a nickname. It's Mrs. Lady Lovely Locks". This is an anachronism, as the Lady Lovely Locks line of products were not produced until after the mid-1980s.

German audio tapes
In Germany, ten audio tapes were produced by label Europa, which extended on and continued the story lines that were never resolved by the short running TV-show. Not only did the tapes dive into Lady's childhood, they also resolved Prince StrongHeart's curse by turning him human, featured the couple's wedding, the birth of their daughter, as well as the infant's kidnapping by Duchess RavenWaves and her glorious rescue. While each character had her or his own voice actor, the series was narrated by Hans Paetsch. The voice actors differed from those used in the animated series.

Voices
 Tony St. Vincent - Lady Lovely Locks, Pixiesparkle
 Jeannie Elias - Maiden Fair Hair, Pixiebeauty, Snags, Dulla
 Brian George - Shining Glory, Pixieshine, Hairball
 Danny Mann - Prince Strong Heart, Tanglet, Comb Gnomes
 Louise Vallance - Duchess Raven Waves, Maiden Curly Crown

Releases
In Germany the first 3 episodes (6 counting the way Germans numbered them) were released on 3 VHS tapes, containing just the plain episodes dubbed in German with the intro and outro scenes as well as a TV commercial for the Lady Lovely Locks toy series.

In November 2015, the entire series has been released on DVD in Germany containing both, German and English audio (Dolby Digital 2.0 Mono) under the name "Lady Lockenlicht" which translates into "Lady Locks Light". It uses the broadcast TV material as seen on German television, which is 1:1 identical to the English video material except that it is converted to PAL and therefore slightly faster than the original NTSC format (PAL-SpeedUp).

References

External links
 
 Lady Lovely Locks and The Pixietails - Unofficial Website
 List of Dolls

1980s American animated television series
1980s toys
1987 American television series debuts
1988 American television series endings
American children's animated adventure television series
American children's animated fantasy television series
American Greetings
Animated television series about orphans
First-run syndicated television programs in the United States
Doll brands
Kideo TV
Mattel
Television series by DIC Entertainment
Television series by DHX Media